The Bârsa (in its upper course also: Bârsa Groșetului) is a left tributary of the river Olt in Romania. It discharges into the Olt near Feldioara. Its source is in the Făgăraș Mountains. As several tributaries also have the name Bârsa, in order to differentiate them, the main course of the river is frequently referred to as Bârsa Mare. The river Ghimbășel, formerly a direct tributary of the Olt, was redirected towards the Bârsa.

Tributaries

The following rivers are tributaries to the river Bârsa (from source to mouth):

Left: Bârsa lui Bucur, Bârsa Fierului, Brebina Mare
Right: Valea Mărului, Izvorul Lerescu, Bârsa Tămașului, Valea Podurilor, Padina lui Călineț, Padina Urșilor, Padina Bădoaiei, Padina Șindileriei, Padina Calului, Padina Hotarului, Valea Crăpăturii, Toplița, Râul Mare (Valea Prăpăstiilor), Turcu, Sohodol, Ghimbășel

References

Rivers of Romania
Rivers of Brașov County
 
Zărnești